Propebela profunda is a species of sea snail, a marine gastropod mollusk in the family Mangeliidae.

Description
The length of the shell attains 8 mm.

Distribution
This marine species occurs off Argentina and was found in the San Jorge Gulf, Santa Cruz Province at a depth of 600 m.

References

 Castellanos, Z.J.A. de & Landoni N. (1993), Catálogo descriptivo de la malacofauna marina magallánica 11. Neogastropoda: Turridae. Notas de la Comisión de Investigaciones Científicas de la Provincia de Buenos
Aires, La Plata, 31 pp

External links
  SIGNORELLI, JAVIER H., DIEGO URTEAGA, and VALERIA TESO. "Zulma Ageitos de Castellanos: Publications and status of described taxa." Zootaxa 4034.1 (2015): 45–69.
 
 

profunda
Gastropods described in 1993